Aljaž Krefl (born 20 February 1994) is a Slovenian professional footballer who plays as a defender for Slovenian PrvaLiga side Olimpija Ljubljana.

Club career
Krefl joined Olimpija Ljubljana from Rudar Velenje in June 2015.

On 8 February 2017, he was sent on loan to the Serbian side Spartak Subotica.

International career
Krefl has been a member of the Slovenian under-21 team.

Honours
Olimpija Ljubljana
Slovenian PrvaLiga: 2015–16, 2017–18

References

External links
NZS profile 
 

1994 births
Living people
Slovenian footballers
Slovenia youth international footballers
Slovenia under-21 international footballers
Slovenian expatriate footballers
Association football fullbacks
NK Rudar Velenje players
NK Šmartno 1928 players
NK Olimpija Ljubljana (2005) players
FK Spartak Subotica players
NK Aluminij players
Slovenian PrvaLiga players
Slovenian Second League players
Serbian SuperLiga players
Expatriate footballers in Serbia
Slovenian expatriate sportspeople in Serbia